The Bluefaced Leicester (BFL) is a longwool breed of sheep which evolved from a breeding scheme of Robert Bakewell, in Dishley, Leicestershire in the eighteenth century.  First known as the Dishley Leicester, and then the Hexham Leicester, because of the prevalence of the breed in Northumberland, the name Bluefaced Leicester became known at the beginning of the 20th century. In the 1970s, the Bluefaced Leicester was exported to Canada.  Exported frozen semen from the United Kingdom is now used to expand the genetic diversity in Canada and the United States. It is raised primarily for meat.

Characteristics
BFL sheep have curly, fine, rather lustrous wool which is one of the softest of the UK clip. The fleeces are not very heavy, only weighing . They have no wool on the head or neck, although the pattern and shape of the wool is most like the Wensleydale, but having smaller, tighter curls.

Bluefaced Leicesters are recognisable through their Roman noses, which have a dark blue skin which can be seen through the white hair, hence the name. They are tangentially related to the original Leicester Longwool breed. BFL rams are put over hill sheep ewes to produce mules, which combine the prolificacy of the BFL with the hardiness and mothering ability of the hill sheep (- mules are the UK's most numerous sheep).

References

External links

 Bluefaced Leicester Sheep Breeders Association - United Kingdom
 www.blueleicester.de - Bluefaced Leicester Sheep Breeders' Association in Deutschland e.V.
 Bluefaced Leicester Breeders Association - United States
 Bluefaced Leicester Union of North America

Sheep breeds
Sheep breeds originating in England